Yauza may refer to:

 Yauza (river), a river in Moscow, Russia
 Yauza River, a tributary of the Lama River of Moscow and Tver oblasts of Russia
 Yauza River, a tributary of the  Gzhat River of Smolensk Oblast, Russia
 Yauza railway station, in Moscow, Russia
 81-720/721, or Yauza, a Russian subway car model
 5887 Yauza, a minor planet